The Gold Coast football club may refer to either:

 Gold Coast Football Club, an Australian football side currently in development vying for entry into the Australian Football League in 2011.
 Gold Coast United FC an association football side that joined the A-League in the 2009–10 Season.
 Gold Coast Titans a rugby league side in the NRL.